André Felippe Seixas Dias or simply André Dias (born 11 March 1981), is a Brazilian former football striker.

Honours
Santos
Brazilian League: 2002

Spartak Moscow
Russian Cup 2003

Al Ain FC
Etisalat Emirates Cup: 2008/2009
UAE President Cup: 2008/2009

Cruzeiro
Campeonato Mineiro: 2011

Santa Cruz
Campeonato Pernambucano: 2013

Contract
Al-Wasl (Loan) 19 July 2007 to 14 July 2008
Al Ain FC 15 July 2008

External links
 Guardian Stats Centre
 CBF
 sambafoot
 crvascodagama.com
 netvasco.com.br

1981 births
People from Montes Claros
Sportspeople from Minas Gerais
Living people
Brazilian footballers
Association football forwards
Santos FC players
Clube Atlético Juventus players
FC Spartak Moscow players
Esporte Clube São Bento players
Mirassol Futebol Clube players
Paraná Clube players
Iraty Sport Club players
CR Vasco da Gama players
Al-Wasl F.C. players
Al Ain FC players
Cruzeiro Esporte Clube players
América Futebol Clube (MG) players
Villa Nova Atlético Clube players
Botafogo Futebol Clube (SP) players
Santa Cruz Futebol Clube players
Democrata Futebol Clube players
Campeonato Brasileiro Série A players
Campeonato Brasileiro Série C players
Russian Premier League players
UAE Pro League players
Brazilian expatriate footballers
Expatriate footballers in Russia
Brazilian expatriate sportspeople in Russia
Expatriate footballers in the United Arab Emirates
Brazilian expatriate sportspeople in the United Arab Emirates